The Khordad 15 is an Iranian designed and built surface-to-air missile (SAM) system. The system was unveiled to the public on 9 June 2019 in an address made by Iranian Defence Minister Amir Hatami in Tehran, Iran. The system was developed by the Iran Aviation Industries Organization (IAIO). It shall have the capability to detect and intercept fighter jets, stealth targets, unmanned combat aerial vehicles (UCAV) and cruise missiles. It operates in conjunction with Sayyad-3 missiles. The surface-to-air missile system was developed in order to counter missiles and other aerial threats presented by the presence of extra-regional forces at military bases in countries around Iran. It was unveiled amid escalating tensions with the United States and Europe's failing attempts at upholding its commitments to the 2015 Iran nuclear deal.

Name 
The Khordad 15 air defense system is named in honor of the 1963 demonstrations in Iran, which according to the Iranian calendar is known as the 15 Khordad uprising. It was a series protests in Iran against the arrest of Ayatollah Ruhollah Khomeini after his denouncement of Iranian Shah Mohammad Reza Pahlavi and Israel. The Shah's regime was taken by surprise by the massive public demonstrations of support and it was these events which established the power of religious opposition to the Shah, and Khomeini as a major political and religious leader.

Design 
The Khordad 15 air defense system was designed and is manufactured by the Iran Aviation Industries Organization (IAIO). The system is equipped with a passive electronically scanned array radar and independent launch pads which work in conjunction to detect, intercept and destroy potential threats. The setup of the SAM system includes two military trucks. One with a rotating, rectangular launcher on the bed which contains four missile canisters in two rows of two canisters each but is capable of utilizing only one row of two canisters. Another with a mounted rotating slab-shaped radar antenna.

Capabilities 
The Khordad 15 is capable of detecting, intercepting, and destroying six targets simultaneously.

Operators 
 : At least 9 SAM launchers have been seen, more likely in service.
 : In service with the Syrian Air Defense Force.

See also 
 Defense industry of Iran
 Islamic Republic of Iran Army
 List of military equipment manufactured in Iran

References

External links 
 Iran ‘Khordad 15th’ air defense system with Sayyad-3 missile – Islamic Republic of Iran Broadcasting (Farsi), references that the system was designed and manufactured by the IAIO.

21st-century surface-to-air missiles
Missile defense
Surface-to-air missiles of Iran
Guided missiles of Iran
Military equipment introduced in the 2010s